This is a season-by-season list of records compiled by Princeton in men's ice hockey. Princeton's team has been continually active since 1899 with the exception of three years due to the two world wars.

Princeton University has been named as the National Champion three times with all occurrences happening prior to any official NCAA Tournament.

Season-by-season results

Note: GP = Games played, W = Wins, L = Losses, T = Ties

* Winning percentage is used when conference schedules are unbalanced.

Footnotes

References

 
Lists of college men's ice hockey seasons in the United States
Princeton Tigers ice hockey seasons